U The End A is a 2016 Kannada psychological love thriller film written and directed by Nagendra Karanik, produced under the banner Shri Thrayambike Devi Talkies, starring Anant Nag, Nagendra Karanik and Kumuda in the lead roles. Sadhu Kokila and Raju Thalikote feature in supporting roles.

Plot
This movie is a psychological love thriller. The main lead of the movie, Rohan (Nagendra Karanik) is a young man with powerful political background, experiences an Astral Travel towards his future and see that a girl is going to betray him end his life. His struggle to find answers to all the questions he faces in his Astral Travel forms the crux of the story.

Cast
 Nagendra Karanik as Rohan
 Kumuda as Madhu/Aishwarya
 Anant Nag
 Sadhu Kokila
 Raju Talikote
 Vijaykumar
 Yashaswini Karanik

Production
The shooting of the movie commenced in February 2013 and finished in July 2014. The movie has been shot in Bangalore and some locations of Goa and Manali.

Soundtrack
The music of the movie has been composed by Manu Sri and the background score by Bharath B. J.

References

2016 films
2010s romance films
2010s Kannada-language films